Infren da Conceição David Matola (born 8 February 1996), known as Nanani, is a Mozambican footballer who plays as a defender for Liga Desportiva de Maputo and the Mozambique national football team.

Career

International
Nanani made his senior international debut on 29 May 2018, playing the entirety of a 3–0 victory over Comoros at the 2018 COSAFA Cup.

Career statistics

International

References

External links
Nanani at Sky Sports

1996 births
Living people
GD Maputo players
Liga Desportiva de Maputo players
UD Songo players
Moçambola players
Mozambican footballers
Mozambique international footballers
Association football defenders
Sportspeople from Maputo